Allahuekber Mountains (which means "Allahu akbar Mountains"), is a mountain range in northeastern Turkey. The Kızılırmak River winds through it. It is part of the Pontic Mountains.

When World War I began in 1914, the range was astride the border between the Ottoman Empire and the Russian Empire. Turkish troops suffered a disaster during the Battle of Sarikamish,  when they were ordered to recapture the Kars area, which was then part of the Russian Empire. Thousands of Turkish soldiers died of hypothermia in the winter snow of the Allahuekber Mountains.

In January 2022 a statue in memory of Turkish soldiers that froze to death in WWI was unveiled in Sarıkamış district.

References

Mountain ranges of Turkey
Landforms of Erzurum Province
Landforms of Kars Province